Aglaia duperreana is a species of plant in the family Meliaceae. It is a shrub or small tree with yellow flowers.
Its origin is in Vietnam, but is now found throughout South East Asia.

References

External links

duperreana
Flora of Indo-China
Flora of Malaysia